Clinton Depot may refer to:

 Clinton Depot (Minnesota), a historic railway station in Clinton, Minnesota
 Clinton Depot (North Carolina), a historic railway station in Clinton, Sampson County, North Carolina
 Clinton station (disambiguation)